is a Japanese footballer who plays as a forward for J3 League   club FC Ryukyu.

Career

Hosei
Abe joined Hosei University in 2006 and played football for the university.

Tokyo Verdy
Abe then joined J. League Division 2 side Tokyo Verdy on a free transfer in January 2010. He made his league debut on 10 April 2010 in Verdy's 1–0 loss to Ehime, coming on at half time.

VfR Aalen
After three seasons at Tokyo Verdy, Abe joined 2. Bundesliga side VfR Aalen in January 2013. He made his league debut on 16 February 2013 coming on as a 65th-minute substitute in Aalen's 1–0 loss to Hertha BSC. He scored his first goal for the club on 17 March 2013 in the 90th minute to draw the game 2–2 against SV Sandhausen.

Career statistics

Club

1Includes Emperor's Cup and DFB-Pokal.
2Includes J. League Cup.
3Includes AFC Champions League.

References

External links
Profile at Vegalta Sendai

1987 births
Living people
Hosei University alumni
Association football forwards
Association football people from Tokyo Metropolis
People from Kodaira, Tokyo
Japanese footballers
J1 League players
J2 League players
J3 League players
2. Bundesliga players
Tokyo Verdy players
VfR Aalen players
Ventforet Kofu players
FC Tokyo players
FC Tokyo U-23 players
Ulsan Hyundai FC players
Vegalta Sendai players
FC Ryukyu players
Japanese expatriate footballers
Japanese expatriate sportspeople in Germany